Why I killed Gandhi is a biographical drama movie about the assassination of Mahatma Gandhi. This is a short film which runs for 45 minutes. This movie shows the reason that Nathuram Godse provided for assassinating Gandhi during his trials in the court. The role of Nathuram Godse has been played by Member of Parliament from the Nationalist Congress Party, Amol Ramsing Kolhe.

References

2017 films
Indian films based on actual events
Films about Mahatma Gandhi
Works about the Mahatma Gandhi assassination
Indian biographical drama films